— From Lewis Carroll's "Jabberwocky", published as part of Through the Looking Glass

Nationality words link to articles with information on the nation's poetry or literature (for instance, Irish or France).

Events
 April – French author Victor Hugo moves to Brussels to take care of the family of his son, who has just died, but closely follows events in the Paris Commune, on April 21 publishing the poem "Pas de représailles" (No reprisals) and on June 11 writing the poem "Sur une barricade" (On the barricade).

Works published in English

United Kingdom
Death years link to the corresponding "[year] in poetry" article:
 Robert Browning:
 Blaustion's Adventure
 Prince Hohenstiel-Schwangau, Saviour of Society
 Lewis Carroll (pen name of C. L. Dodgson), Through the Looking Glass, and What Alice Found There, including "Jabberwocky" and "The Walrus and the Carpenter" (published this year, although the book states "1872")
 "Thomas Maitland" (i.e., Robert Williams Buchanan) attacks Dante Gabriel Rossetti and other members of what Buchanan calls the "Fleshly School" of English poetry in The Contemporary Review (October); and Rossetti replies in "The Stealthy School of Criticism" in the Athenaeum (December 16)
 Monckton Milnes, falsely attributed to George Colman the Younger, The Rodiad, flagellatory poem, falsely dated 1810
 James Brunton Stephens, Convict Once, Scottish-born Australian poet published in London
 Algernon Charles Swinburne, Songs before Sunrise
 Alfred Lord Tennyson, "The Last Tournament" published in The Contemporary Review, December edition (one of Tennyson's "Arthurian Idylls", later published in Gareth and Lynette 1872)

United States
 William Cullen Bryant, Poems
 William Ellery Channing, The Wanderer
 Bret Harte, East and West Poems
 John Hay, Pike County Ballads
 Emma Lazarus, Admetus and Other Poems
 Joaquin Miller, pen name of Cincinnatus Heine (or Hiner) Miller:
 Songs of the Sierras
 Pacific Poems

 Walt Whitman:
 Leaves of Grass, fifth edition
 Passage to India
 John Greenleaf Whittier, Miriam and Other Poems

Works published in other languages
 François Coppée, Fais ce que dois , short verse drama inspired by the Franco-Prussian War; France
 Arthur Rimbaud, Le bateau ivre ("The Drunken Boat"), France

Births
Death years link to the corresponding "[year] in poetry" article:
 February 3 – Francis Joseph Sherman (died 1926), Canadian
 February 25 (February 13 Old Style) – Lesya Ukrainka, born Larysa Kosach (died 1913), Ukrainian
 April 16 – John Millington Synge (died 1909), Irish dramatist, poet, prose writer, collector of folklore, a prominent figure in the Irish Literary Revival and a co-founder of the Abbey Theatre
 June 17 – James Weldon Johnson (died 1938), African-American author, poet, early civil rights activist and prominent figure in the Harlem Renaissance
 July 3 –  W. H. Davies (died 1940), Welsh-born poet and writer who spends most of his life as a tramp in the United States and United Kingdom, but becomes known as one of the most popular poets of his time
 July 15 – Kunikida Doppo 國木田 獨歩 (died 1908), Japanese, Meiji period romantic poet and one of the novelists who pioneers naturalism in Japan (surname: Kunikida)
 September 2 – John Le Gay Brereton (died 1933), Australian poet, critic and academic
 September 9 – Ralph Hodgson (died 1962), British
 October 30 – Paul Valéry (died 1945), French philosopher, author and Symbolist poet who also writes essays and aphorisms on art, history, letters, music and current events
 November 1 – Stephen Crane (died 1900), American novelist, poet and journalist
 Date not known
 Hafez Ibrahim (died 1932), Egyptian, Arabic-language "poet of the Nile"
 Madhavanuj, pen name of Kashinath Hari Modak (died 1917), Indian, Marathi-language poet and translator; a physician

Deaths
Death years link to the corresponding "[year] in poetry" article:
 February 12 – Alice Cary (born 1820), American poet
 April 23 – James Monroe Whitfield (born 1822), African-American barber, poet and abolitionist
 May 11
 John Herschel (born 1792), English polymath
 Thomas Buchanan Read (born 1822), American poet and portrait painter
 July 31 – Phoebe Cary (born 1824), sister of Alice, American poet
 September 22 – Charlotte Elliott (born 1789), English religious poet

See also

 19th century in poetry
 19th century in literature
 List of years in poetry
 List of years in literature
 Victorian literature
 French literature of the 19th century
 Poetry

Notes

19th-century poetry
Poetry